Dules is a genus of marine ray-finned fishes which is a member of the subfamily Serraninae of the family Serranidae, which includes the groupers and anthias. It is a monotypic genus containing a single species Dules auriga which is found in the south western Atlantic Ocean off the coasts of southern Brazil, Uruguay and northern Argentina. It is a hermaphrodite which is found in deeper offshore waters and is frequently taken as a bycatch by deep water fisheries.

References

Serraninae
Fish described in 1829
Taxa named by Georges Cuvier
Perciformes genera